Cato Erstad (born 31 January 1964) is a Norwegian footballer. He played in one match for the Norway national football team in 1987.

References

External links
 
 

1964 births
Living people
Norwegian footballers
Norway international footballers
Sportspeople from Hamar
Association football defenders
Hamarkameratene players